The Annunciation Church is a Catholic church located at the corner of Texas Avenue and Crawford Street in Downtown Houston, Texas.

History
Annunciation Church sprung from the congregation at St. Vincent's, Houston's first Catholic church.  In 1866, Father Joseph Querat and Galveston Bishop Claude M. Debuis believed the congregation was outgrowing the old building and started planning for a new one.  The congregation chose the name for the planned building, "Church of the Annunciation." The original architect is unknown, but was dedicated on September 10, 1871. Nicholas Clayton altered the building, adding the bell tower twin towers in 1884.

The property is listed on the National Register of Historic Places.

The church remains Houston's oldest existing church and, as such, the property was eventually faced with a foundation problem. A large void had developed underneath the church's southwest corner and, symptomatically, the foundation subsided. Through a polymer injection process work at Annunciation Catholic Church was completed in two days with minimal disruption to mass and parishioners.

See also
 National Register of Historic Places listings in Harris County, Texas

References

External links

Roman Catholic Archdiocese of Galveston–Houston

1860s establishments in Texas
1869 establishments in Texas
Roman Catholic churches completed in 1869
Buildings and structures in Houston
Churches on the National Register of Historic Places in Texas
National Register of Historic Places in Houston
Recorded Texas Historic Landmarks
Roman Catholic churches in Houston
Romanesque Revival architecture in Texas
Romanesque Revival church buildings in the United States
19th-century Roman Catholic church buildings in the United States